Kołbiel  is a village in Otwock County, Masovian Voivodeship, in east-central Poland. It is the seat of the gmina (administrative district) called Gmina Kołbiel.

The village has a population of 1,880 (as of 2011).

Transport 
The village lies at the intersection of expressway S17 and national road 50 (future A50 motorway).

External links
 Jewish Community in Kołbiel on Virtual Shtetl

References

Villages in Otwock County
Masovian Voivodeship (1526–1795)
Warsaw Governorate
Warsaw Voivodeship (1919–1939)